Gavers is an unincorporated community in Columbiana County, in the U.S. state of Ohio.

History
The community was named for Gideon Gaver, a pioneer settler. A post office called Gavers was established in 1848, and remained in operation until 1902. Besides the post office, Gavers had a country store.

References

Unincorporated communities in Columbiana County, Ohio
1848 establishments in Ohio
Populated places established in 1848
Unincorporated communities in Ohio